The Everest is an Australian Turf Club Weight for Age Thoroughbred horse race run over 1,200 metres on turf at Randwick Racecourse in Sydney, Australia. Run for the first time in 2017 as a Special Conditions class since it is not yet eligible for Group race status.

Prize money was increased in 2018 to $15 million, it is the richest race in Australia and the richest turf race in the world. It is held annually in October as the feature race of the Sydney Spring Carnival.

The race has an unusual entry fee structure, similar to that of the Pegasus World Cup. Twelve "slots" are sold for $600,000 each, which represents a slot in the starting gate for a then unspecified horse. The slot holder then has the right to race, lease, contract or share a starter, or sell their place in the gate. For example, in the 2017 running, slotholder James Harron struck a deal with the owners of Redzel to use his spot to enter their horse, who went on to win the race.

Prior to the 2018 event, the race attracted criticism from the Australian public and media after organisers of the event successfully lobbied for the sails of the Sydney Opera House to be used as an advertisement for the race. Protests against this proposal and government support of it were held at the Opera House along with submission of a petition with over 300,000 signatures collected in less than a week in October 2018, however the pre-race event still went ahead in a modified format.

In October 2022 the barrier draw was released to the public with a night time display over Sydney Harbour using 501 drones and the race attracted 46,221 patrons.

Winners

References

Horse races in Australia
Open sprint category horse races
Randwick Racecourse
Everest
Sports competitions in Sydney
2017 establishments in Australia